Paul Spooner (March 20, 1746 – September 4, 1789) was a Vermont political figure who served as lieutenant governor.

Early life

Paul Spooner was born in Dartmouth, Massachusetts on March 20, 1746.  He was the youngest of the 10 children of Elizabeth (Ruggles) and Daniel Spooner. He was raised in Petersham, Massachusetts, studied medicine, and moved to Hartland, Vermont to begin a medical practice in 1768.

Career
In 1775, Spooner was a delegate to the New York Provincial Congress.  (At the time jurisdiction over Vermont was the subject of a dispute between New Hampshire and New York.

Spooner served as a member of Vermont's Revolutionary War Council of Safety from 1778 to 1782.  In 1779 he was elected Hartland's Town Clerk, and he also served as Hartland's Town Meeting Moderator.

From 1779 to 1789 Spooner served as a justice of the Vermont Supreme Court.

In 1780 and 1781 Spooner was Windsor County's Probate Judge, and from 1780 to 1782 he was one of Vermont's agents who negotiated with the Continental Congress.

In 1782 he became lieutenant governor, and he served until 1787. He was Assistant Judge of the Windsor County Superior Court from 1779 to 1782, Chief Judge from 1784 to 1785, and Assistant Judge again from 1785 until his death.

Spooner died at the age of 44 in North Hartland on September 4, 1789. His home can still be found in North Hartland, very close to Cutts Cemetery where he is buried.

Family
Dr. Spooner married Asenath Wright on April 15, 1770. They had three children before her death in March, 1777.  Daughter Elizabeth (Betsy) (1770-1853) was the wife of David Denny (1764-1821) of Northfield, Vermont, and the mother of nine children.  Their sons were Paul S. (b. 1772) and Amasa (b. 1774).  In 1779, he married a cousin, Anna Cogswell (d. 1800), who was the widow of Captain Jeremiah Post (d. 1777) of Orford, New Hampshire.  Paul and Anna Spooner had no children.

Paul S. Spooner was an early settler of Hardwick, and served as town clerk and a member of the Vermont House of Representatives.

References

1746 births
1789 deaths
People from Hartland, Vermont
Lieutenant Governors of Vermont
People of Vermont in the American Revolution
Justices of the Vermont Supreme Court
Vermont state court judges
People of pre-statehood Vermont
Burials in Vermont
People from Dartmouth, Massachusetts